Michiana Parkway may refer to part or all of the following:

M-217 (Michigan highway)
County Road 17 (Elkhart County, Indiana)